Barriers of Society is a 1916 American silent drama film directed by Lloyd B. Carleton. Universal based the film on the story written by Clarke Irvine and adapted for the screen by Fred Myton. The feature film stars Dorothy Davenport, Emory Johnson, and an all-star cast of Universal contract players. 

The son of a poor fish merchant rescues a society girl stranded in the ocean. The boy falls in love, and she forgets about him. Fate brings them together years later when she is a guest aboard a yacht, and he is part of the crew. The yacht's owner has devised a calculated plan to win the woman's love. He plans to fake a ship emergency, eventually stranding the two of them alone on an uncharted island. The strategy backfires when the owner, the girl, and the crew member end up marooned on the island. Both men love the same woman. Intrigues abound, and in the end, the rich girl and the poor sailor realize they love each other. Fate brought them together, and their love overcame the Barriers of Society. 

Universal Film Manufacturing Company released the film on October 16, 1916. Prints and/or fragments were found in the Dawson Film Find in 1978.

Plot

Westie Phillips is the son of a poor commercial trawler and his wife. One day while paddling his canoe around the ocean, he finds a pretty girl marooned on a rock. Since the tide is rising, he rescues her and takes her to safety. The young girl turns out to be Martha Gorman, the daughter of the wealthy Silas Gorman. In that instant, Westie falls in love. Martha thanks him and forgets him.

Harry Arnold is a prosperous man, much older than Martha. Harry is also a man in love. He constantly flirts with Martha, hoping to win her hand in marriage. Despite Arnold's persistent entreaties, Martha rebuffs them all. Martha's father, Silas Gorman, is not against such a wedding but will not render an opinion. Silas wants his daughter to make her own marriage choices.

The time occurs for every young man to seek their fortune when they must go out in the world. That day arrives for Westie, and he leaves home to set out in the world. Westie gets shanghaied while seeking employment. He wakes up aboard a ship headed to the Orient. They victimized Westie like most sailors, forceable impressed into service aboard a ship. Somehow, Westie jumps ship and escapes to Honolulu.

Harry Arnold has worked out an insidious plot to win Martha's hand in marriage. First, Arnold invites Martha and her father to go on a cruise aboard his yacht. The thought of partying aboard a ship appeals to both of them, and they accept Arnold's invitation. Once at sea, one of the yacht's crewmen becomes troublesome. Arnold forces the captain to head to port and put him ashore. Once in port, they seek a replacement. They hire a hungry Westie Phillips to replace the sailor. Westie comes on board and recognizes Martha. She does not know who Westie is since the rescue was long ago and long forgotten. After he assumes his duties, he sees Martha repulse lecherous Arnold's advances.

Now is the time for Harry Arnold to start the next phase of his plan. Arnold will have the captain of his yacht stage a fake shipwreck near an uncharted island. The crew and partygoers will jump into lifeboats. Arnold will have one lifeboat set in the water with only Martha and himself on board. They will head to the remote island. Arnold feels that by force or otherwise, he can persuade Martha to love and marry him. After a month, the yacht's captain will return and rescue them.

Events unfold, and Westie senses Martha is in peril. Westie catches wind of Arnold's plan. He scrambles to Arnold's lifeboat and asks to go with them. At that exact moment, the captain hits him in the back of the head, knocking him out. Arnold and Martha row their dinghy towards the island. Westie gains his senses and realizes the boat is long gone. He swims to an empty lifeboat and starts paddling toward shore. He hears a woman scream.

After Westie reaches the beach, he discovers Arnold is trying to force himself on Martha. He saves her, and Arnold agrees to behave. Two alpha males and beautiful women agree to make a go of it while awaiting rescue. Arnold is driving himself into a rage after his plan goes awry. He pulls Westie aside and offers him a fortune if he moves to the other side of the island. Westie will not abandon the woman of his dreams. Arnold is beside himself. Later in the evening, Arnold decides if he can't have Martha, then no one will. He tries to murder her. Once again, Westie comes to her relief. An epic battle occurs, and Westie kills Arnold.

Time passes, a rescue ship appears, and the couple flag the ship down. Before their rescue ship arrives, they glance at each other and realize they are in love.

Cast
Dorothy Davenport as Martha Gorham
Emory Johnson as Westie Phillips
Richard Morris as Harry Arnold
Frederick Montague as Silas Gorham
Alfred Allen as John Phillips
Miss Whiting as Mary Phillips

Production

Pre production

Development
According to the book - The Universal Story, Carl Laemmle (-1939) produced around 91 movies in 1916.
Lloyd B. Carleton (–1933) started working for Carl Laemmle in the Fall of 1915. Carleton arrived with impeccable credentials, having directed some 60 films for the likes of Thanhouser, Lubin, Fox, and Selig. 
Between March and December 1916, 44-year-old Lloyd Carleton directed 16 movies for Universal, starting with The Yaqui and ending with The Morals of Hilda. Emory Johnson acted in all 16 of these films. Of Carleton's total 1916 output, 11 were feature films, and the rest were two-reel shorts. 
In 1916, Carleton directed all 13 films pairing Dorothy Davenport and Emory Johnson. This film would be the twelfth in the 13-film series. These totals show Carl Laemmle was clearly giving the Davenport-Johnson pairing one of his elite directors from the working cadre of universal directors to produce the screen chemistry Laemmle was seeking.

Casting
Dorothy Davenport (1895-1977) was an established star for Universal when the  year-old actress played Martha Gorham. She had acted in hundreds of movies by the time she starred in this film. The majority of these films were 2-reel shorts, as was the norm in Hollywood's teen years. She had been making movies since 1910. She started dating Wally Reid when she was barely 16, and he was 20. They married in 1913. After her husband died in 1923, she used the name "Mrs. Wallace Reid" in the credits for any project she took part in. Besides being an actress, she would eventually become a film director, producer, and writer.
Emory Johnson (1894-1960) was  years old when he acted in this movie as Westie Phillips. In January 1916, Emory signed a contract with Universal Film Manufacturing Company. Carl Laemmle of Universal Film Manufacturing Company thought he saw great potential in Johnson, so he chooses him to be Universal's new leading man. Laemmle's hope was Johnson would become another Wallace Reed. A major part of his plan was to create a movie couple that would sizzle on the silver screen. Laemmle thought Dorothy Davenport and Emory Johnson could create the chemistry he sought. Johnson and Davenport would complete 13 films together. They started with the successful feature production of Doctor Neighbor in May 1916 and ended with The Devil's Bondwoman in November 1916. After completing the last movie, Laemmle thought Johnson did not have the screen presence he wanted. He decided not to renew his contract. Johnson would make 17 movies in 1916, including 6 shorts and 11 feature-length Dramas. 1916 would become the second-highest movie output of his entire acting career. Emory acted in 25 films for Universal, mostly dramas with a sprinkling of comedies and westerns. 
Richard Morris (1862-1924) was a  year-old actor when he played villainous yacht owner Harry Arnold. He was a character actor and former opera singer known for Granny (1913). He would eventually participate in many Johnson projects, including  |In the Name of the Law (1922),  The Third Alarm (1922),  The West~Bound Limited (1923), The Mailman (1923), The Spirit of the USA (1924) until his untimely death in 1924. 
Frederick (Fred) Montague (-1919) was a  year-old actor when he played Silas Gorham, the wealthy father of Martha Gorham. He was an English film actor and appeared in 59 films between 1912 and 1919. 
Alfred Allen (1866-1947) was  years old when he was selected to play John Phillips. Allen was highly educated, had a commanding presence and stood six feet tall, and weighed two hundred pounds. He got his start in the film industry at Universal city in 1913.  He landed his first role in 1915. His roles were character parts, and he played mostly fathers, villains, or ranch owners. Alfred Allen appeared in 69 features from 1916 through 1929. After Heartaches he would appear in four more Davenport-Johnson projects: A Yoke of Gold, The Unattainable, The Human Gamble and Barriers of Society.

Themes
FATE as defined in the Merriam-Webster Dictionary:
 The will or principle or determining cause by which things, in general, are believed to come to be as they are or events to happen as they do. 
A movie advertisement in The Seattle Star stated :
 The story is a thrilling one of a romance of two souls brought together by fate on a desert island, two people from entirely different strata of society, who fall in love, their mutual attraction overcoming all the barriers that society puts in their way. The match that destiny has ordained is at last fulfilled. 
Besides fate, another tagline of the film was - A man's millions against a woman's will.

Screenplay
This film was based on a Clarke Irvine play. The movie was adapted for the screen by Frederick Myton (1885-1955). Myton was  years old when the movie was released. He would also create the screenplay for the next and last film in the Davenport-Johnson series of films - The Devil's Bondwoman.

Filming
Lloyd Carleton and Universal determined the majority of the exteriors needed to be filmed aboard a yacht. They chartered a large steam vessel, and the movie company sailed off into the Pacific. The festive atmosphere ended when the ship encountered rough seas. The ship was tossed about like a dog's chew toy; waves poured over the decks, and filming became impossible. Several of the crew became seasick, and filming had to be further postponed. Finally, the weather cleared, and the crew was able to complete the scenes.
The interiors were filmed in the studio complex at Universal Studios located at 100 Universal City Plaza in  Universal City, California.

Post production
An article published in the March 1917 issue of The Moving Picture Weekly describes the ascendency of a young actress named Roberta Wilson, including her starring role in Barriers of Society. The item was a misprint. The article meant to say -  a featured role in  The Isle of Life" released around the same time as Barriers of Society. 

Release and reception

Official release
The copyright for this film was filed on Friday, September 29, 1916.  The release date of Monday, October 16, 1916, was cited in several movie magazines. Yet, the film is advertised in various newspapers on Friday, October 6 (Chicago Tribune) and Saturday, October 7 (Brooklyn, New York)

Since Red Feather Photo Plays were always released on Mondays in 1916, a better candidate for a release date is Monday, October 2, 1916.

Advertising
Based on an American Film Institute standard, films with a running time of forty-five minutes or longer are considered feature films. In 1915, feature films were becoming more the trend in Hollywood.  In 1916, Universal formed a three-tier branding system for their releases. Universal films decided to label their films according to the size of their budget and status. Universal, unlike the top-tier studios, did not own any theaters to market its feature films. By branding their product, Universal gave theater owners and audiences a quick reference guide.  Branding would help theater owners make judgments for films they were about to lease and help fans decide which movies they wanted to see.

Universal released three different types of feature motion pictures:B movies (Hollywood Golden Age)#Roots of the B movie: 1910s–1920s
 Red feather Photoplays – low-budget feature films
 Bluebird Photoplays – mainstream feature release and more ambitious productions
 Jewel – prestige motion pictures featuring high budgets using prominent actors

This film carried Universal's "Red Feather" brand, designating a low-budget feature film. 

Reviews
The critics generally liked this film.

Critical Response
In the October 14, 1916 issue of The Moving Picture World, movie critic Robert C. McElravy points out:

  This five-reel offering owes much of its interest to two factors of universal interest in the plot conception, rather than to any special strength of presentation. There is a pleasing allegorical touch to all of the opening scenes, and the observer's interest is well maintained. The film has some weaknesses in construction but tells an entertaining story. It has no high dramatic moments but carries the interest quite well without them.In the October 21, 1916 issue of The Moving Picture World, the staff review:

  The story is simple in plot and quite appealing. Some construction is a little choppy, but it has a good adventurous flavor and retains the interest despite some weaknesses.Audience responseLincoln, Nebraska population 18,498 I want to thank you for the feature you sent me, "The Barriers of Society," and must say it is one of the best pictures I have had in a long time. The first day I ran it was Monday, and during the exciting scenes of the picture, I thought my patrons would tear the house down. The consequences were they all passed out of the theatre with a big smile of satisfaction on their faces, and last night (Tuesday), I had the biggest Tuesday night's business in the history of the house. Nathan DixThe Lily theatrePreservation status
In 1978, an extraordinary discovery was made in Dawson City located in Canada's Yukon Territory. The city of Dawson used a large stockpile of silent films to bolster a sagging hockey rink in 1929. The permafrost preserved the films. The film cache was discovered in 1978. The discovery would yield 533 reels of nitrate film containing numerous lost movies. The story was chronicled in the movie -  Dawson City: Frozen Time. Among the preserved films in the Dawson Film Find was the 5-reel bluebird production of The Unattainable'', released in September 1916.  The permafrost also preserved this film.  In both cases, only one reel was recoverable from each of the 5 reel feature films. The salvaged reels were donated to the Library of Congress.

Gallery

References

External links

Barriers of Society at TCM
Barriers of Society at AFI

List of Universal Pictures films (1912–1919)
Universal Pictures
List of American films of 1916

1916 lost films
1916 drama films
1916 films
American black-and-white films
American silent feature films
Associated Exhibitors films
Lost American films
Lost drama films
Melodrama films
Universal Pictures films
Films directed by Lloyd B. Carleton
1910s English-language films
1910s American films
Silent American drama films